Hakeem Kae-Kazim  (born 1 October 1962) is a Nigerian-British actor and producer. He portrayed Georges Rutaganda in the film Hotel Rwanda (2004) and won SAFTA for his performance in the film Riding with Sugar (2020). He produced and starred in Man on Ground (2011), for which he received two Africa Movie Academy Award nominations.

On television, Kae-Kazim is known for his roles in the CBC miniseries Human Cargo (2004), the Starz series Black Sails (2014–2016), and the BBC series Troy: Fall of a City (2018).

Early life
Kae-Kazim was born in Lagos to a family from Abeokuta, Ogun State and re-located to South London when he was a baby. His interest in acting began with school plays and the National Youth Theatre, where he discovered his "love for theatre, for acting". He trained at the Bristol Old Vic Theatre School, graduating in 1987 and was offered a space with the Royal Shakespeare Company, where he continued his classical training.

Career
After working alongside Brian Cox and Ian McKellen at the Royal National Theatre, Kae-Kazim began appearing on British television in episodes of The District Nurse, The Bill, Saracen, Screen One, and Love Hurts. In 1994, he landed his first recurring role as Mr. Manyeke in the seventeeth series the BBC children's series Grange Hill. He then appeared in the ITV police procedural Trial & Retribution.

Kae-Kazim began living and working in South Africa when he was 25. He made his feature film debut in Ross Kettle's After the Rain (1999) alongside Louise Lombard and Paul Bettany. However, it was his role as Georges Rutaganda in the 2004 Academy Award-nominated film Hotel Rwanda, which brought him to international attention. That same year, he starred in the Canadian CBC miniseries Human Cargo, for which Kae-Kazim was nominated for a Gemini Award. He then appeared in the Syfy and BBC miniseries The Triangle.

Following the success of Hotel Rwanda, Kae-Kazim went on to appear in the films Slipstream alongside Sean Astin and The Front Line before playing Captain Jockard in Pirates of the Caribbean: At World's End. Kae-Kazim made guest appearances in the likes of Lost, Law & Order: Special Victims Unit and Criminal Minds. He joined the cast of the Fox series 24 as Colonel Iké Dubaku for its 2008 tie-in television film 24: Redemption and its 2009 seventh season in 2009.

Kae-Kazim starred in the Nigerian films Inale (2010) and Last Flight to Abuja (2012), and also appeared in Half of a Yellow Sun. He produced and starred in Man on Ground (2011) about Nigerian immigrants to South Africa, earning Kae-Kazim nominations for Best Film and Best Actor at the 8th Africa Movie Academy Awards. He also had producing credits on the films Black Gold and Black November.

From 2014 to 2016, Kae-Kazim was in the main cast of the Michael Bay-produced Starz series Black Sails for its first three seasons as Mr Scott. Kae-Kazim stated his character was based on Black Caesar, a real life pirate of the time. He had a recurring role in second season of Dominion on Syfy, played Samson in part one of the 2016 miniseries remake of Roots on the History Channel, and had a role in the action horror film Daylight's End. In November 2017, Kae-Kazim was cast in the recurring role of Cesil Colby in the CW reboot series Dynasty. That same year, he appeared in the action film 24 Hours to Live.

Kae-Kazim starred in the 2018 BBC fantasy series Troy: Fall of a City as Zeus, king of the Olympians. This was followed by a recurring role in season 2 of the Fox series Deep State.

For his performance in the 2020 Netflix film Riding with Sugar, Kae-Kazim won the South African Film and Television Award (SAFTA) for Best Supporting Actor in a Feature Film. He also appeared in the BBC America adaptation of Terry Pratchett's The Watch and the Sky One series Intergalactic, as well as the films Black Beauty, The Shuroo Process, and Godzilla vs. Kong. In 2022, Kae-Kazim starred in the Nigerian epic fantasy film Aníkúlápó and as Majordome the Starz adaptation of Dangerous Liaisons. In January 2022, it was announced he would make his directorial debut with the upcoming feature film It’s the Blackness, set in South London where Kae-Kazim grew up.

Voiceover work 
Called the 'Man with a Beautiful Voice', Kae-Kazim has done extensive voiceover work. His voice has been featured in a number of well known video games including Final Fantasy XIV, Halo 3 ODST, Halo: Reach, Guild Wars, Pirates of the Caribbean: At World’s End, The Golden Compass and The Saboteur. Kae-Kazim has spoken of voice over work as being "a lot of fun", and something he enjoys doing.

Philanthropy 
Kae-Kazim is an appointed global ambassador for Africa 2.0, a civil society organisation providing a platform for emerging and established African leaders to drive forward the transformation of Africa.

Speaking about his role as ambassador, Kae-Kazim said: "I am truly honoured to be associated with Africa 2.0 – a pioneering platform for a new generation of African leaders to inspire and create a solid infrastructure- to shape a brighter future for our continent".

Personal life
Kae-Kazim and his South African wife Bronwyn have three daughters. He has lived and worked in South Africa, the United Kingdom, the United States, and Nigeria over the course of his career.

Filmography

Filmmaking

Film

Television

Video games

Stage

Awards and nominations

References

External links

Living people
1962 births
Alumni of Bristol Old Vic Theatre School
Black British filmmakers
Black British male actors
British expatriates in South Africa
British male film actors
British male Shakespearean actors
British male stage actors
British male television actors
British male voice actors
English people of Nigerian descent
Male actors from Lagos
Male actors from London
National Youth Theatre members
Nigerian emigrants to the United Kingdom
Nigerian expatriates in South Africa
Nigerian male film actors
Nigerian male stage actors
Nigerian male television actors
Nigerian male voice actors
Yoruba male actors